Novoalexeyevka is a rural locality (a selo) and the administrative center of Novoalexeyevsky Selsoviet of Ivanovsky District, Amur Oblast, Russia. The population was 627 as of 2018. There are 8 streets.

Geography 
Novoalexeyevka is located 28 km north of Ivanovka (the district's administrative centre) by road. Rakitnoye is the nearest rural locality.

References 

Rural localities in Ivanovsky District, Amur Oblast